In axiomatic set theory, Shelah cardinals are a kind of large cardinals.

A Shelah cardinal has a normal ultrafilter containing the set of weakly hyper-Woodin cardinals below it.

References 

 Ernest Schimmerling, Woodin cardinals, Shelah cardinals and the Mitchell-Steel core model, Proceedings of the American Mathematical Society 130/11, pp. 3385-3391, 2002, online

Large cardinals